The 1929–30 Washington Huskies men's basketball team represented the University of Washington for the  NCAA college basketball season. Led by tenth-year head coach Hec Edmundson, the Huskies were members of the Pacific Coast Conference and played their home games on campus at the UW Pavilion in Seattle, Washington.

Washington traveled to Los Angeles and met Southern division winner USC in the Pacific Coast championship series. The Huskies lost the first game, won the second, setting up a third and deciding game, which they lost by six. It was the seventh consecutive year that the title series was won by the Southern division team.

The National Invitation Tournament (NIT) debuted in 1938, and the NCAA Tournament in 1939.

Postseason results

|-
!colspan=6 style=| Pacific Coast Conference Playoff Series

References

External links
Sports Reference – Washington Huskies: 1929–30 basketball season
Washington Huskies men's basketball media guide (2009–10) – History

Washington Huskies men's basketball seasons
Washington Huskies
Washington
Washington